Cătălin Ionuț Botezatu (born 12 December 1987) is a Romanian rugby union player. He plays in the wing and occasionally fullback position for amateur SuperLiga club Baia Mare and București based European Challenge Cup side the Wolves. Botezatu also plays for Romania's national team the Oaks.

References

External links

 
 
 
 

1987 births
Living people
Romanian rugby union players
Romania international rugby union players
Rugby union wings
CSM Știința Baia Mare players